Hammer Hill may refer to:

Hammer Hill (Canada), a hill in Alberta
Hammer Hill (Hong Kong), a hill in New Kowloon